"Baby Love" is a song by American music group the Supremes from their second studio album, Where Did Our Love Go. It was written and produced by Motown's main production team Holland–Dozier–Holland and was released on September 17, 1964.

"Baby Love" topped the Billboard pop singles chart in the United States from October 25, 1964, through November 21, 1964, and in the United Kingdom pop singles chart concurrently. Beginning with "Baby Love", the Supremes became the first Motown act to have more than one American number-one single, and by the end of the decade, would have more singles hitting the top slot than any other Motown act (or American pop music group) with 12, a record they continue to hold.

It was nominated for the 1965 Grammy Award for Best Rhythm & Blues Recording, losing to Nancy Wilson's "How Glad I Am". It is considered one of the most popular songs of the late 20th century, "Baby Love" was ranked number 324 on the Rolling Stone list of The 500 Greatest Songs of All Time. It dropped to number 499 on the 2021 update of the list. The BBC ranked "Baby Love" at number 23 on The Top 100 Digital Motown Chart, which ranks Motown releases by their all time UK downloads and streams.

History
At the insistence of Berry Gordy hoping for a follow-up chart-topper, Holland–Dozier–Holland produced "Baby Love" to sound like  "Where Did Our Love Go".  Elements were reincorporated into the single such as Diana Ross's cooing lead vocal and oohing, Florence Ballard and Mary Wilson's "baby-baby" backup, the Funk Brothers' instrumental track, and teenager Mike Valvano's footstomping. Further, both Ballard and Wilson had brief solo ad-libs towards the end of the song on the released version (after this release Ross would be the only member to have any solos on the 1960s singles).

It was the second of five consecutive Supremes songs to go to number one in the United States, reaching the top spot of the U.S. Billboard Hot 100 pop singles chart on October 31, 1964, and staying there for four weeks. The song also reached number one on the UK Singles Chart for two weeks before being dislodged by The Rolling Stones' "Little Red Rooster",  and topped the Cash Box magazine's R&B chart.  "Baby Love" and Roy Orbison's "It's Over" are the only American singles topped the UK charts between 1963 and 1965.

Billboard stated that "the swinging harmony style keeps [the song] rolling all the way through."  Cash Box described it as "a heartfelt, steady beat thumper...that the femmes deliver in ultra-commercial fashion."

"Baby Love" was later included on the soundtrack to the 1975 feature film Cooley High.

Personnel
 Lead vocals by Diana Ross
 Background and ad-lib vocals by Florence Ballard and Mary Wilson
 All instruments by the Funk Brothers
Earl Van Dyke – piano
Eddie Willis – guitar
James Jamerson – bass
Richard "Pistol" Allen – drums
Jack Ashford – vibraphone
Henry Cosby – tenor saxophone
Mike Terry – baritone saxophone solo
 Footstomps by Mike Valvano

Charts

Weekly charts

Year-end charts

All-time charts

Certifications

Cover versions
 In 1981, British singer and actress, Honey Bane covered the song with record label Zonophone (EMI). The single peaked at #58 on the UK music charts.

See also
 List of Billboard Hot 100 number-one singles of 1964

References

External links
 

1964 singles
1964 songs
The Supremes songs
Billboard Hot 100 number-one singles
Cashbox number-one singles
Number-one singles in New Zealand
UK Singles Chart number-one singles
Songs written by Holland–Dozier–Holland
Song recordings produced by Brian Holland
Song recordings produced by Lamont Dozier
Motown singles